The Social Democratic Convention (Convention sociale démocrate) is a political party in Mali. In the 29 April 2007 presidential election, the party's candidate, Mamadou Blaise Sangaré, won 1.58% of the popular vote. 

Political parties in Mali
Social democratic parties

References